Swanny may refer to:

Swanndri, a trade name for a range of outdoor clothing, very popular in New Zealand
In the expression "up the swanny", it means the Suwannee River in the USA
It is a common nickname for football commentator Lynn Swann
It is also a nickname of Graeme Swann, an England Test cricketer 
In cycling, a "swanny" or soigneur is a supporting role in a cycling team